Caetano Maria Pacheco Pais dos Reis e Sousa (born 1968)  is a senior group leader at the Francis Crick Institute and a professor of Immunology at Imperial College London.

Education
Reis e Sousa was educated at Atlantic College in Wales, Imperial College London (BSc) and the University of Oxford where he was awarded a Doctor of Philosophy degree in 1992 for research on dendritic cells, and the phagocytosis of antigens by Langerhans cells supervised by Jonathan Austyn.

Career and research
After working as a postdoctoral researcher at the National Institute of Allergy and Infectious Diseases (NIAID) in the United States, with Ronald Germain, he joined the Imperial Cancer Research Fund (ICRF) in 1998. He headed the Immunobiology Laboratory which became part of the Francis Crick Institute in 2015. He is also a professor of Immunology at Imperial College London and honorary professor at University College London (UCL) and King's College London.

Caetano's research centres on the mechanisms involved in sensing infection, cancer and tissue injury. He has helped to define the cells and pathways involved in innate immune detection of RNA viruses, fungi and dead cells.

Awards and honours
Reis e Sousa was elected a Fellow of the Royal Society (FRS) in 2019, and is also a Fellow of the Academy of Medical Sciences (FMedSci), a member of the European Molecular Biology Organization (EMBO) and was made an Officer of the Order of Sant'Iago da Espada by the Government of Portugal in 2009. He was awarded the Louis-Jeantet Prize for Medicine in 2017.

References

Fellows of the Royal Society
Fellows of the Academy of Medical Sciences (United Kingdom)
People educated at Atlantic College
Members of the European Molecular Biology Organization